Dishwashing liquid (or washing-up liquid in British English), also known as dishwashing soap, dish detergent, and dish soap is a detergent used to assist in dishwashing. It is usually a highly-foaming mixture of surfactants with low skin irritation, and is primarily used for hand washing of glasses, plates, cutlery, and cooking utensils in a sink or bowl. In addition to its primary use, dishwashing liquid also has various informal applications, such as for creating bubbles, clothes washing and cleaning oil-affected birds.

History

Washing soda (sodium carbonate) is used for dishwashing, and may be used in areas with hard water. It was used for dishwashing before detergents were invented in Germany during World War I. Liquid detergent used for dishwashing was first manufactured in the middle of the 20th century. Dishwashing detergent producers started production in the United States in the 1930–1940s. Teepol, the first such in Europe, commenced production in 1942.

In 2005, dishwashing detergent retail sales totaled nearly US$10 billion worldwide.

Types
Dishwashing detergents for dishwashers are manufactured and marketed variously as cartridges, gel, liquids, pacs, powder, and tablets. Any dishwashing liquid may contain bleach, enzymes, or rinsing aids. Some dishwashing detergents may be homemade, using ingredients such as borax, essential oil, eucalyptus oil and grated bar soap, among others.

Dishwashing detergents can be formulated to work under different circumstances. In some cases suitably formulated they can be used with cold water or sea water, although they will not generally work as well as those intended for, and used with, hot water.

Common ingredients

The main ingredient is water; the main active ingredients are detergents. Detergents are used, rather than soaps, because they do not react with any minerals in the water to form soap scum. There are other thickening and stabilizing agents. Other ingredients may include surfactants, hydrotrope, salts, preservatives, fragrances, and dyes.

Surfactants remove grease and stuck food particles. They may also provide foam.

Some dishwashing products contain phosphates. Phosphate makes dishes cleaner but can also cause harmful algal bloom as the wastewater goes back to the natural environment. Because of this, it is banned as a component in many places.

In 2010, the United States FDA raised health concerns over triclosan, an antibacterial substance used in some dish liquids. Elsewhere, triclosan has been found to create problems at wastewater treatment plants, whereby it can "sabotage some sludge-processing microbes and promote drug resistance in others." The United States FDA has found that triclosan provides no health benefits over soap and water. As of 2014, at least one state within the United States has banned triclosan in dishwashing liquids.

Many dishwashing liquids contain perfume which can cause irritant or allergic contact dermatitis.

Brands
Euromonitor International research on dishwashing trends in eighty countries identified producers and brands with the largest 2013 retail value shares. Six multinational companies (Procter and Gamble, Colgate-Palmolive, Henkel, Reckitt Benckiser, Unilever, Ajax) collectively held the greatest retail value shares in sixty-five of those countries. Summaries below show percentages of retail value shares and leading brand names in each country, according to Euromonitor International's 2013 reports.

Procter and Gamble held the highest retail value share percentages in twenty countries: with Fairy brand, United Kingdom, Estonia, Saudi Arabia (56%), United Arab Emirates (34%), Latvia (35%), Lithuania (32%), Finland (23%), Serbia (38%), Bosnia-Herzegovina (30%), Georgia (26%) and Uzbekistan (26%); Sweden (39%) with brand Yes, the Swedish Fairy brand; Greece (40%) with Fairy and Ava brands; with Fairy and Mif brands, Kazakhstan (28%) and Russia (29%); and Ukraine (41%) with Fairy and Gala brands; Canada (39%) with Cascade and Dawn brands; United States (52%) with Cascade and Dawn brands; Mexico (44%) with Salvo and Dawn brands; Philippines (54%) with Joy brand. Fairy has one of the highest market shares in the Egyptian market.

Unilever held highest retail value share percentages in thirteen countries: Netherlands (25%); with Sunlight brand, Cameroon (32%), South Africa (56%), Indonesia, Thailand (66%); India (61%) with Vim brand; Vietnam (56%) with Sunlight Green Tea, Sunlight Lemon, and Sunlight Active Gel; France (34%) with Sun Turbo Gel and Sun tout en 1; with Sun brand, Switzerland (31%), and Belgium (30%); Argentina (54%) with Ala and Ala Ultra brands; Chile (57%) with Quix brand; and Uruguay (56%) with Hurra Nevex and Cif brands.

Henkel held highest retail value share percentages in nine countries: Germany (29%); Romania (35%), Slovakia (33%), Hungary (30%), Croatia (22%) with Pur and Somat brands; Algeria (22%) with Isis Pril; Egypt with Port Said Detergents and Pril brands; Slovenia (35%) with Pril brand; and Azerbaijan (22%) with Pril and Pemolux brands.

Reckitt Benckiser held highest retail value share percentages in nine countries: Italy (31%), Spain (29%); with Finish brand: Australia (38%), New Zealand (38%), Austria (32%), Ireland (29%), and Israel (27%); Denmark (30%) with Neophos brand; and Portugal (22%) with Calgonit brand.

Colgate-Palmolive held highest retail value share percentages in nine countries: Morocco (23%); Tunisia (24%) with Citrol brand; Malaysia (29%); Pakistan (55%) with Max brand; with Axion, Costa Rica (39%), Dominican Republic (31%), Colombia (40%), and Ecuador (39%); Guatemala (39%) with Axion and Doña Blanca brands.

Research summaries for three countries listed combined retail value shares that included domestic and international producers: Brazil's domestic producers led hand dishwashing products with Química Amparo, Bombril, and Flora Produtos de Higiene e Limpeza; Poland's Grupa Inco with Ludwik and Lucek brands, and Henka Polska with Pur and Somat brands, led sales with a combined retail value share of 46%; and in Belarus the Russian company PZ Cussons PLC accounted for 24% of retail value shares, with Morning Fresh brand, followed by Procter and Gamble (20%) and Henkel (19%).

Summaries for two countries listed combined results for international companies and brands: in the Czech Republic, Procter and Gamble, Henkel, and Reckitt Benckiser held a combined 71% retail value share; and in Turkey Reckitt Benckiser's Finish brand led with 32% retail value share for automatic dishwashing, while Henkel had 31% retail value share, and Pril brand led hand dishwashing liquid with a 42% retail value share.

In fifteen markets, domestic producers held the greatest 2013 retail value share with local brands: in China, Guangzhou Liby Enterprise Group held a 30% retail value share; Hong Kong company Lam Soon held 44% retail value share with Axe and Labour brands; Singapore company Lion Corp led sales with Mama Lemon, Mama Lemon Antibacterial, and Mama Royal brands; South Korean company LG Household & Health Care Ltd. held a 54% retail value share with dishwashing brands Pong Pong, Natural Pong and Safe; in Japan, Kao held a 33% retail value share with CuCute brand; Alimentos Polar in Venezuela held a 37% retail value share with Las Laves brand. In Nigeria, PZ Industries PLC held a 63% share, with Morning Fresh brand. In Norway, Lilleborg AS held 71% retail value share, with Sun and Zalo brands; in Bulgaria, Ficosota Syntez held 29% retail value share, with Eho and Feya brands; in Macedonia, Saponia dd held 22% retail value share; in Iran, Paxan Co. held 24% retail value share with Barf, Orchid, Goli, and Pride brands; in Bolivia, Astrix SA held 47% retail value share with Ola brand; in Peru, Intradevco Industrial SA held 63% retail value share with Sapolio brand; in Venezuela, Alimentos Polar held 37% retail value share with Las Llaves brand. The summary of dishwashing in Kenya noted most consumers there use alternatives like laundry detergent powder or soap instead of dishwashing liquids, but listed Haco as the leading dishwashing liquid, from Haco Tiger Brands Ltd.

Primary uses
Dishwashing liquid is used primarily for removing food from used dishes and tableware. Heavy soil (large food particles) is generally scraped from the dishes before using. Detergent formula can vary based on use (hand or automatic).

Hand dishwashing

Hand dishwashing is generally performed in the absence of a dishwashing machine, when large "hard-to-clean" items are present, or through preference. Some dishwashing liquids can harm household silver, fine glassware, anything with gold leaf, disposable plastics, and any objects made of brass, bronze, cast iron, pewter, tin, or wood, especially when combined with hot water and the action of a dishwasher. When dishwashing liquid is used on such objects it is intended that they be washed by hand.

Hand dishwashing detergents utilize surfactants to play the primary role in cleaning. The reduced surface tension of dishwashing water, and increasing solubility of modern surfactant mixtures, allows the water to run off the dishes in a dish rack very quickly. However, most people also rinse the dishes with pure water to make sure to get rid of any soap residue that could affect the taste of the food.

Dishwashing liquid can be a skin irritant and cause hand eczema. Those with "sensitive skin" are advised amongst other things to persuade someone else to do the washing up.

Automatic dishwashing
Automatic dishwashing involves the use of a dishwashing machine or other apparatus. It is generally chosen through convenience, sanitation, or personal preference. The cleaning is less reliant on the detergent's surfactants but more reliant on machine's hot water as well as the detergent's builders, bleach, and enzymes. Automatic dishwashing detergents' surfactants generally have less foam to avoid disrupting the machine.

Informal uses

Reader's Digest notes its use as an ant killer, weed killer, to help spread water-borne fertilizer, and to wash human hair. Good Housekeeping says it can be used mixed with vinegar to attract and drown fruit flies. Dishwashing detergent has been used to clean mirrors as well as windows.
 Pling, an open source general purpose cleaner for glazed, plastic, chrome and inox bathroom and kitchen surfaces, published by Twibright Labs, uses dishwashing liquid as one of active ingredients.
 Dishwashing liquid can be mixed with water and additional ingredients such as glycerin and sugar to produce a bubble-blowing solution.
 Dishwashing liquid may be used for cleaning delicate clothing fabrics such as hosiery and lingerie.
 Dishwashing liquid is frequently recommended in a dilute solution to make decals and vinyl graphics easier to position when applying.
 In industry, dishwashing liquid is also used to inspect pressurized equipment for leaks, such as propane fittings. It is used to inspect pneumatic tires for flats, as well as for quality assurance during the installation process, and as a mounting bead lubricant.
 Dishwashing liquid has uses as an ingredient in making homemade garden pest deterrents. Oregon State University's Cooperative Extension Service notes the use of dishwashing liquid to get rid of spidermites. Dish soap has also been used to deter aphids. In some instances, the dish soap may be toxic to plant leaves and cause them to "burn". Use of soap or dish detergent to help spread pesticide on plants is noted by University of Georgia extension service, but not recommended.
 A solution of dishwashing liquid and water may be used to remove coffee, tea, olive oil, soda and fruit juice stains from fabrics. One dishwashing liquid brand has been used to remove stains from white or lightly colored cloth napkins.
 Dishwashing liquid has been used to treat birds affected by oil spills. After the Exxon Valdez oil spill in 1989, the International Bird Rescue Research Center received hundreds of cases of dishwashing liquid that were used for this purpose. More dishwashing liquid was donated during the Deepwater Horizon oil spill to the International Bird Rescue Research Center and the Marine Mammal Center.
 Dishwashing liquid is often used to activate homemade slime as a substitute for borax

See also
 Dishwasher detergent
 Cleaning agent
 List of cleaning agents
 List of cleaning products
 Soap
 Green cleaning
 Washing

References

Further reading

External links 
 
 
 

Cleaning products
Dishwashing